The Steveston Fisherman's Memorial is a freestanding memorial commemorating the lives and deaths of fishermen working out of Steveston, British Columbia. It takes the form of a giant fishing net needle and stands a few metres from the sea at Garry Point Park.

The memorial contains a large number of names of fishermen who died at sea, and the following words:

May 4, 1996
This memorial honours all the fishermen of our community who have
lost their lives in the pursuit of their profession.
Their courage, dedication and contribution to the development of our
community will never be forgotten."

Monuments and memorials in British Columbia
Buildings and structures in Richmond, British Columbia
History of fishing